Natalia Mihaylovna Rogova (born 29 May 1995) is a Russian badminton player from Primorye Vladivostok badminton club. In 2017, she won her first international title at the Slovenia International Series tournament in the women's doubles event partnered with Olga Arkhangelskaya.

Achievements

BWF International Challenge/Series
Women's Doubles

 BWF International Challenge tournament
 BWF International Series tournament
 BWF Future Series tournament

References

External links
 

1995 births
Living people
Badminton players from Moscow
Russian female badminton players
21st-century Russian women